The EZ 135 Drive is a 3.5" removable platter hard disk drive. It was introduced by SyQuest Technology in 1995. It had a maximum capacity of 135 MB per disk.

A successor drive, known as the SyQuest EZFlyer, was released in 1996.  It was backwards compatible with the EZ 135 disks, and could utilize a higher capacity 230 MB disk.

Specifications
 Capacity: 135 MB
 Average seek time: 13.5 ms
 Burst transfer rate: 4 MB/s
 Buffer size: 64K
 Mechanism rated for 200,000 hours

Interfaces
The EZ 135 drive was available with several interfaces.  The external drive was available with parallel or SCSI interfaces; the internal drive was available with IDE or SCSI interfaces.

Pricing
At introduction, the EZ 135 Drive had the following prices (in US dollars):

 135 MB cartridge: $20.00
 EZ 135 Drive – external SCSI: $240.00
 EZ 135 Drive – internal IDE: $200.00

Sales
The EZ 135 Drive was designed to be a competitor to the Iomega Zip drive and LS-120 SuperFloppy.  The original box listed several advantages:
 Much faster
 Higher capacity
 2-year warranty

Additionally the removable hard disk cartridges included a 5-year warranty.

Unfortunately, the EZ 135 drive was not backwards compatible with other SyQuest drives, and the original capacity was never increased beyond 135 MB. The Zip drive became popular and SyQuest's sales declined.

See also
 SyQuest Technology
 Zip drive
 Jaz drive
 Orb Drive

References

External links

 SYQT homepage
 .
 SyQuest EZFlyer Information
 .

SyQuest storage devices
Hard disk drives